Jack's Big Music Show is an American musical children's television series produced for the Noggin channel. It was created and executive produced by David Rudman, Todd Hannert, and Adam Rudman through their company Spiffy Pictures. The premiere episode was simulcast on both Noggin and its sister channel, Nickelodeon, on September 12, 2005. The show ran for two seasons and 26 episodes in total, which finished airing on October 13, 2007.

The popularity of the show made the idea of appearing on it attractive to musicians. An executive from Noggin in 2006 said that they were "clamoring to get onto Jack's Big Music Show." In 2008, the show was nominated for a Daytime Emmy Award for Outstanding Pre-School Children's Series.

In May 2007, production was suddenly cancelled and it was announced that no more episodes would be produced. The last episode aired on October 13, 2007. However, it continued to rerun on the Nick Jr. Channel until December 26, 2014. The last episodes to air as a part of the show's final rerun were "Snow Day" and "The Grumpy Squirrel" as part of the Nick Jr. Holiday Party.

Premise
The series focuses on music-loving Jack, his best friend Mary, and his drum-playing dog Mel, all of whom are puppets. The show takes place in Jack's backyard clubhouse and centers on the characters' passion for music. The characters play music in every episode and are often accompanied by other puppets or human musicians. Each episode starts with Jack's mom calling him that he has to leave for an activity soon. They feature two music videos by children's musical artists and a performance by the Schwartzman Quartet about the episode's theme. At the end of each episode, a big "finale" song is played. Sometimes, Jack leaves and tells his mom what they did today, while other times they continue to play music in the clubhouse. Mel can be seen popping up during the credits.

Characters

Main
The main characters are Jack, Mary, Mel, and the Schwartzman Quartet.
 Jack (performed and voiced by David Rudman) is a young musician who has a backyard clubhouse full of musical instruments. A blue mouse-like creature with short green hair, he wears an orange sweater with an asterisk on the front. Jack has a very busy schedule, and at the beginning of each episode, his unseen mother mentions a new class or activity that he is attending. He is named after Jack Benny, the host of The Jack Benny Program.
 Mary (performed and voiced by Alice Dinnean) is Jack's best friend, an accordionist. A yellow mouse-like creature with curly purple hair, she wears a red sweater with a heart symbol on the front. Mary is smart, attentive, and likes to find music in unexpected places. Her catchphrase is "What a day!", which she says at the end of each episode. She is named after Mary Livingstone from The Jack Benny Program.
 Mel (performed and voiced by John Kennedy) is Jack's drum-playing dog, a gifted inventor. He has purple-pink fur with green stripes and a green spot around his left eye. He has created all of the contraptions in Jack's clubhouse, including the music video player, and operates them in each episode. He can only talk using "ruff" noises, but Jack understands him. He is named after Mel Blanc from The Jack Benny Program.
 The Schwartzman Quartet (performed and voiced by various puppeteers) are a barbershop quartet of four mouse-like brothers who visit Jack's clubhouse every day to sing a short song. Almost identical to one another, they are all turquoise with stringy red hair, freckles, and matching striped sweaters. They are named after the Sportsmen Quartet from The Jack Benny Program.

Guests
 Earl the Squirrel appears in "Mel's Super Swell Dance Party," "Silly Show,"  "Leonard the Country Squirrel," "Snow Day," and "Jack's Big Orchestra"
 The Little Bad Wolf (performed and voiced by Eric Jacobson) appears in the episode of the same name and "Jack's Big Orchestra"
 The Bongo Birds appear in the episode of the same name and "Jack's Big Orchestra"
 The Bugs appear in "Bug Love" and "Jack's Big Orchestra"
 Henry the Monster (performed and voiced by Joey Mazzarino) appears in the "Music Monster" and "Jack's Big Orchestra"
 The Squirrels appear in "Leonard the Country Squirrel," "Jack's Big Orchestra" and Jack's Super Swell Sing-Along"
 M.C. Turtle appears in "Jack's Super Swell Sing-Along"
 Sheldon the Squirrel (performed and voiced by John Kennedy) appears in "The Grumpy Squirrel" and "Jack's Big Orchestra"
 Gertrude the Groundhog (performed and voiced by Stephanie D'Abruzzo) appears in "Groundhog Day"
 Scat Cat (performed by Stephanie D'Abruzzo) appears in the episode of the same name
 Phil the Coo-Coo Bird (performed and voiced by Eric Jacobson) appears in the episode of the same name
 Leonard the Country Squirrel (performed and voiced by Matt Vogel) appears in the episode of the same name
 Spunky the Alien (performed and voiced by Joey Mazzarino) appears in the episode of the same name
 Royal Messenger Marvin (performed and voiced by John Kennedy) appears in "King of Swing"

Guest musicians

 Yolanda Adams
 Angélique Kidjo
 Laurie Berkner
 Andrew Bird
 Buddy Guy
 Steve Burns
 Steven Drozd
 Comic Book Heroes
 Guy Davis
 The Dirty Sock Funtime Band
 Rebecca Frezza
 Jerry Lawson 
 Leon Thomas III
 The Mighty Weaklings
 Milkshake
 Lisa Loeb
 Music for Aardvarks and Other Mammals
 Jamia Simone Nash
 Nuttin' But Stringz
 Cathy Richardson
 Audra Rox
 Sweet Honey in the Rock
 David Pleasant
 Trachtenburg Family Slideshow Players
 The Quiet Two
 Anne Harris as Prudence

Episodes

Series overview

Season 1 (2005–06)

Season 2 (2007)

Influences
In an interview on the Nick Jr. website, Rudman says that The Jack Benny Show was an influence on Jack's Big Music Show (along with The Little Rascals).

The names Jack, Mary, Mel, and the "Schwartzman Quartet" are references to characters on The Jack Benny Program (Jack Benny, Mary Livingstone, Mel Blanc, and the Sportsmen Quartet). Other possible name references to Jack Benny Program regulars include Sheldon and Leonard (Sheldon Leonard), Phil the Coo-Coo Bird (Phil Harris), and Gertrude the Groundhog (Bea Benaderet's recurring character Gertrude Gearshift)

Hannert says that the music is influenced by Chuck Berry and the whole history of rock and roll.

References

External links 
 
 

2000s American children's television series
2000s American music television series
2000s Nickelodeon original programming
2000s preschool education television series
2005 American television series debuts
2007 American television series endings
American children's musical television series
American preschool education television series
American television shows featuring puppetry
English-language television shows
Nick Jr. original programming
Noggin (brand) original programming
Television shows filmed in Illinois
Television shows set in Chicago
Television series about children
Television shows about dogs
Television series about mice and rats